The Dillon River is a river of the Marlborough Region of New Zealand. The river was named after Constantine Augustus Dillon, who owned a sheep run near the Omaka River.

See also
List of rivers of New Zealand

References

Land Information New Zealand - Search for Place Names

Rivers of the Marlborough Region
Rivers of New Zealand